Pellinen is a Finnish surname. Notable people with the surname include:

 Eila Pellinen (1938–1977), Finnish singer
 Jyrki Pellinen (born 1940), Finnish writer, poet and visual artist
 Jouni Pellinen (born 1983), Finnish freestyle skier
 Jaakko Pellinen (born 1988), Finnish professional ice hockey forward
 Aku Pellinen (born 1993), Finnish racing driver

Finnish-language surnames